Jerry Brubaker (born 1946) is an American composer and arranger of more than 200 works of music for concert band, symphony, and chorus and a professional French horn soloist.

Education and career
In 1968, Brubaker received his undergraduate degree from the Eastman School of Music and later pursued a Master of Music degree from the Catholic University of America.

Brubaker served for 30 years in the United States Navy Band in Washington, D.C., as a French horn soloist and composer and arranger. In 1985, he became the band's chief arranger, and held that position until his retirement from the navy in 1998.

After retiring from the military, Brubaker has performed and arranged for the Village Band of Estes Park (CO), City of Fairfax (VA) Band and the Virginia Grand Military Band and is the current President of The Association of Concert Bands.

Personal life 
Brubaker was born in Altoona, Pennsylvania, in 1946 and was an active musician throughout his early years. During grade school, he performed in a German band with classmates Terry Detweiler and Allen Gibboney. He graduated from the Altoona Area School District in 1964 and received a "Distinguished Alumni Award" from school district in 2006.

He is married to Virginia (Ginny) Brubaker and currently lives in Estes Park, Colorado.

Recordings 
 Concert Suite from The Polar Express, arr. Jerry Brubaker
 Star Wars Heroes, arr. Jerry Brubaker
 Music of Disneyland, arr. Jerry Brubaker
 Suite from Hamilton, arr. Jerry Brubaker
 Peaceful Nation by Jerry Brubaker
 What's Up at the Symphony? Bugs Bunny's Greatest, arr. Jerry Brubaker
 Flower Duet (from Lakmé) arr. Jerry Brubaker
 How the Grinch Stole Christmas (Medley), arr. Jerry Brubaker

References 

American composers
Eastman School of Music alumni
1946 births
Living people